Coronary Reconstruction is an EP by the Belgian death metal band Aborted, released on March 2, 2010 through Century Media Records. The album is the first to be recorded with the band's new 2009 line-up, and was released mainly as a digital EP, with only 1,000 physical copies made. The song "Coronary Reconstruction" contains audio samples from the film Hellbound: Hellraiser II.

Track listing

Personnel 
Sven "Svencho" de Caluwé – vocals
Eran Segal – guitar
Ken Sorceron – guitar
Cole Martinez – bass
Dirk Verbeuren – drums

2010 EPs
Aborted (band) albums
Century Media Records EPs